Punan Batu is a nearly extinct language of Sarawak.

External links

Languages of Malaysia
Punan languages
Endangered Austronesian languages